Matías Tissera (born 6 September 1996) is an Argentine professional footballer who plays as a forward for Ludogorets Razgrad.

Career
Tissera spent his youth career with Argentino de Rojas, Sarmiento de Rosario and Newell's Old Boys. He entered the first-team of Newell's Old Boys in March 2017, making his debut on 18 March in a 3–0 victory over Vélez Sarsfield. Four further appearances followed during 2016–17. On 14 August 2017, Tissera was loaned to Primera B Nacional's Quilmes until June 2018. He featured in twelve matches for Quilmes as they finished 12th. Upon returning to his parent club, Tissera was loaned out again to Independiente Rivadavia of Primera B Nacional. In February 2022, Tissera joined Bulgarian champions Ludogorets Razgrad.

Career statistics
.

Honours

Ludogorets Razgrad
Bulgarian First League: 2021–22
Bulgarian Supercup: 2022

Personal life
On 16 March 2022, Tissera's girlfriend, Sofia Arozamena, gave birth to their first kid, Felipe, in Varna, Bulgaria.

References

External links

1996 births
Living people
People from Rojas Partido
Argentine people of Portuguese descent
Argentine footballers
Association football forwards
Argentine Primera División players
Primera Nacional players
First Professional Football League (Bulgaria) players
Newell's Old Boys footballers
Quilmes Atlético Club footballers
Independiente Rivadavia footballers
Club Atlético Platense footballers
PFC Ludogorets Razgrad players
Argentine expatriate footballers
Expatriate footballers in Bulgaria
Sportspeople from Buenos Aires Province